The Kharkiv State Academic Opera and Ballet Theatre named after Mykola Lysenko was a theater in Kharkiv, Ukraine. It was heavily damaged and possibly destroyed in March 2022 during the Battle of Kharkiv (2022) in the ongoing 2022 Russian invasion of Ukraine when Russian forces attacked Freedom Square. The postmodern theater building was built in 1991 and featured tufa tiles. A student-led study at the Kharkiv School of Architecture found that the theater was considered a "community hub" and that the exterior was popular with skateboarders.

Notable performances at the venue include a 2019 production of the ballet Swan Lake, choreographed by Johan Nus, which used 42 tons of water. On December 23, 2020, the opera house was the site of the funeral for Kharkiv mayor Hennadii Kernes.

Gallery

References

External links 

1991 establishments in Ukraine
2022 disestablishments in Ukraine
Former theatres in Ukraine
Theatre companies in Ukraine
Buildings and structures in Kharkiv
Opera houses in Ukraine
Buildings and structures destroyed during the 2022 Russian invasion of Ukraine
Institutions with the title of National in Ukraine